Nothin' 2 Lose is a 2000 American comedy film, directed by Barry Bowles, and starring Brian Hooks and Shani Bayeté. It was also written by Bowles, and was his second directorial effort, after first working with Hooks in Q: The Movie, in 1998. The film was registered as a low-budget movie in 1999.

Plot
Kwame Gatmon is a young man with a promising career as a music producer and a beautiful girlfriend, Yasmine. But Yasmine is tired of watching all of her girlfriends get married while she stands on the sidelines, and one day she gives Kwame an ultimatum—either he marries her in 30 days, or the relationship is over. Kwame is not sure what to do; while he loves Yasmine, he also likes his freedom.

But the worst part of it all is, he has not been getting much positive feedback from all of his friends who are married men. He has been unwillingly placed at a major crossroad in his life, and now he has to choose between living the carefree lifestyle he has become accustomed to, or keeping the one true love of his life.

Cast
Brian Hooks as Kwame Gatmon
Shani Bayeté as Yasmine
Cedric Pendleton as Scooter
Crystal Sessums as Tymkia
Michael A. LeMelle as Iggy
Martin C. Jones as Lance
Rodney J. Hobbs as Reverend Banks
Ryan Sands as Mookie
Kweli as Mom
Carl Gilliard as Uncle Cooper

Awards & nominations
2001 DVD Exclusive Awards
Best Actor — Brian Hooks (nominated)
Best Directing — Barry Bowles (nominated)
Best Live-Action Video Premiere — Martin C. Jones (nominated)

External links

2000 films
African-American comedy films
African-American gender relations in popular culture
2000 comedy films
2000s English-language films
2000s American films